Oleksiy Demyanyuk (July 30, 1958 in Baranivka, Ukrainian SSR – April 5, 1999) was a high jumper from the Soviet Union, who set the world's best year performance in 1981 with a leap of 2.33 metres at a meet in Leningrad. He ended up in eleventh place at the 1980 Summer Olympics in Moscow.

His son, Dmytro Dem'yanyuk, is also a high jumper.

References 
 1981 Year Ranking
 Aleksey Demyanyuk's profile at Sports Reference.com

1958 births
1999 deaths
Ukrainian male high jumpers
Soviet male high jumpers
Athletes (track and field) at the 1980 Summer Olympics
Olympic athletes of the Soviet Union
Sportspeople from Zhytomyr Oblast